Joplin Downtown Historic District is a national historic district located at Joplin, Jasper County, Missouri.   The district encompasses 48 contributing buildings in the central business district of Joplin.  It developed between about 1883 and 1958 and includes representative examples of Mission Revival, Art Deco, and Modern Movement style architecture. The district includes the previously listed Fifth and Main Historic District, Newman Brothers Building, Fox Theater, and St. Louis and San Francisco Railroad Building. Other notable buildings include the Liberty Building (1923), Cunningham Bank / Quinby Building (c. 1884, c. 1924), Model Clothing Store Building (c. 1899), Lichliter-Kassab Building (1893, 1940), Zelleken Block (c. 1890), Muenning Building (c. 1885), and Frank Hollcroft Livery Building (c. 1890).

It was listed on the National Register of Historic Places in 2008.

References

Historic districts on the National Register of Historic Places in Missouri
Mission Revival architecture in Missouri
Art Deco architecture in Missouri
Modernist architecture in Missouri
Buildings and structures in Joplin, Missouri
National Register of Historic Places in Jasper County, Missouri